The Nova Scotia Paramedic Society (NSPS) is a professional association established in 2011 that promotes the study, research, and communication of the history of Emergency Health Services (EHS) within the province of Nova Scotia, Canada.

History
When in 2010, in the "John Rossiter Room" at the New Halifax Infirmary, paramedics John Bignell and Frank Johnston overheard a conversation between two paramedics talking about " who was John Rossiter?", it had become evident that in less than a decade, history had been lost and the memory of past medics were not being passed down to future generations of Nova Scotian paramedics. Tony Eden, director of EHS Ground Ambulance Services, had started collecting articles and memorabilia related to the history of Nova Scotia's EHS.

In 2013 the NSPS started working with the Nova Scotia government to create Medic Monday. Legislature unanimously adopted a motion from PC caucus whip MLA Allan MacMaster.
In the Spring of 2011, a small group of physicians and paramedics met with Tony Eden, to talk about setting up the Nova Scotia Paramedic Society. Subsequently, the group registered the society with the Nova Scotia Registry of Joint Stock Companies on September 28, 2011.

Projects 
 Medic Monday
 Public Archive Days - Researching newspapers and health records
 1954 Pontiac Ambulance Restoration Project
 Weekly Emergency Communications Podcast: The Last Wire Podcast

Structure 
The society has a central executive and regional groups and representatives, intended to act as a conduit for information to and from Nova Scotian paramedics.

Membership
There are currently three levels of membership available within the society

 Full - past and present Nova Scotian paramedics (registered with EHS or Ambulance Operators Association of Nova Scotia).
 Student -  persons currently undertaking an EHS approved course leading to eligibility to apply to the register
 Associate - anyone with an interest in the furtherance of the aims of the society, the ambulance professional, and pre-hospital care

See also 
 Paramedic Association of Canada

External links 
 
 Ambulance Newspapers

References

Medical associations based in Canada
Medical and health organizations based in Nova Scotia
Professional associations based in Nova Scotia
Emergency medical services in Canada
2011 establishments in Nova Scotia